La Perla is a district of the Constitutional Province of Callao in Peru, and one of the seven districts that comprise the port city of Callao.

The current mayor of La Perla is Anibal Jara Aguirre. It was officially established as a district on October 22, 1964.

Geography
The district has a total land area of 2.75 km². Its administrative center is located 18 meters above sea level.

Boundaries
 South: Pacific Ocean
 East: San Miguel (in the Lima Province)
 North: Bellavista
 West: Downtown Callao

Demographics
According to the 2005 census by the INEI, the district has 59,602 inhabitants, a population density of 21,673.5 persons/km² and 14,699 households in the district.

External links
 Municipalidad de La Perla - La Perla District Council official website
 Todo Callao (in Spanish)

Districts of the Callao Region